The following is a list of Richmond Spiders football seasons.

Seasons

References

 
Richmond Spiders
Richmond Spiders football seasons